Horsfieldia pulcherrima is a species of plant in the family Myristicaceae. It grows naturally as a tree in Sumatra and Peninsular Malaysia.

References

pulcherrima
Trees of Sumatra
Trees of Peninsular Malaysia
Vulnerable plants
Taxonomy articles created by Polbot